Shotgun were an American funk band from Detroit, Michigan, that recorded six albums between 1977 and 1982.  They also had eight hit records on the Billboard R&B chart, the most successful being "Don't You Wanna Make Love" which reached #35 on the R&B chart in 1979. The band was formed by 24-Carat Black band members William Talbert, Tyrone Steels, Ernest Lattimore and Gregory Ingram.

Of the band's 1977 debut album Shotgun, Dusty Groove said, "This first album by Shotgun — one of the many major label funk groups who flourished briefly at the end of the 70s has a harder sound than most of this nature — with plenty of guitars in the mix, and an overall heavier sound than you'd expect from an effort of this type. In fact, there's almost a rock/funk kind of groove going on — one that would be more typical of early 70s crossover efforts on Epic, in the wake of Sly Stone and other artists like that."

Members 
 Richard Sebastian (trumpet)
 Greg Ingram (saxophone)
 Billy Talbert (keyboards, guitars)
 Ernest Latimore (guitars, vocals)
 Larry Austin (bass)
 Tyrone Steels (drums, vocals)
 Leslie Carter (percussion)
 Robert Resch (drums)

Discography 
Shotgun (ABC 1977)
Good, Bad & Funky (ABC 1978)
Shotgun III (ABC 1979)
Shotgun IV (MCA 1980)
Kingdom Come (MCA 1980)
Ladies Choice (Montage 1982)

See also 

List of funk rock bands

References

External links 
Shotgun at discogs.com

American funk musical groups
Musical groups from Detroit